Sanjay Rajaratnam, PC is a Sri Lankan lawyer. He is the current Attorney General of Sri Lanka. He previously served as the Acting Solicitor General of Sri Lanka from October 2019 up until May 2021.

Education 
Rajaratnam received his primary and secondary education at the St. Peter's College, Bambalapitiya and Royal College, Colombo. He then entered the Sri Lanka Law College and qualified as an attorney-at-law. Rajaratnam also received an LL.M. from the Queen Mary University of London and qualified as a solicitor.

Legal career 
He joined the Attorney General's Department in April 1988 as a State Counsel. He was later promoted as Senior State Counsel, and then Deputy Solicitor General. In 2014, he was appointed as the President's Counsel by the then Sri Lankan President Mahinda Rajapaksa.

In October 2019, he replaced Dilrukshi Dias Wickramasinghe as the acting solicitor general following the latter's leaked controversial phone call with Avant Garde chairman.

On 20 May 2021, the Parliamentary Council approved the appointment of Sanjay Rajaratnam to the position of Attorney General of Sri Lanka replacing Dappula de Livera.

References

External links
 Attorney-General's Department

Attorneys General of Sri Lanka
Solicitors General of Sri Lanka
President's Counsels (Sri Lanka)
Sri Lankan Tamil lawyers
21st-century Sri Lankan lawyers
20th-century Sri Lankan lawyers
Alumni of Royal College, Colombo
Alumni of St. Peter's College, Colombo
Alumni of Sri Lanka Law College
Alumni of Queen Mary University of London
Year of birth missing (living people)
Living people